During the 1966 Houston Astros season in American baseball, the team finished eighth in the National League with a record of , 23 games behind the Los Angeles Dodgers.

This was the second season for the Astrodome, but its first with a playing surface of AstroTurf. The infield portion was installed in March, and the outfield was ready for play on July 19.

Offseason 
 November 29, 1965: 1965 rule 5 draft
Nate Colbert was drafted by the Astros from the St. Louis Cardinals.
Bob Saverine was drafted from the Astros by the Washington Senators.
 January 6, 1966: Johnny Weekly and cash were traded by the Astros to the New York Mets for Gary Kroll.

Regular season

Season standings

Record vs. opponents

Opening Day lineup 
Lee Maye, LF
Sonny Jackson, SS
Jimmy Wynn, CF
Dave Nicholson, RF
Joe Morgan, 2B
Bob Aspromonte, 3B
Chuck Harrison, 1B
John Bateman, C
Robin Roberts, P

Notable transactions 
 June 7, 1966: Fred Stanley was drafted by the Astros in the 8th round of the 1966 Major League Baseball draft.

Roster

Player stats

Batting

Starters by position 
Note: Pos = Position; G = Games played; AB = At bats; H = Hits; Avg. = Batting average; HR = Home runs; RBI = Runs batted in

Other batters 
Note: G = Games played; AB = At bats; H = Hits; Avg. = Batting average; HR = Home runs; RBI = Runs batted in

Pitching

Starting pitchers 
Note: G = Games pitched; IP = Innings pitched; W = Wins; L = Losses; ERA = Earned run average; SO = Strikeouts

Other pitchers 
Note: G = Games pitched; IP = Innings pitched; W = Wins; L = Losses; ERA = Earned run average; SO = Strikeouts

Relief pitchers 
Note: G = Games pitched; W = Wins; L = Losses; SV = Saves; ERA = Earned run average; SO = Strikeouts

Farm system

References

External links
1966 Houston Astros season at Baseball Reference

Houston Astros seasons
Houston Astros season
Houston Astro